Biehlite is an exceptionally rare mineral, an antimony arsenic bearing molybdate with formula . It comes from Tsumeb.

References

Antimony minerals
Molybdenum minerals
Monoclinic minerals
Minerals in space group 15